Sai Kong Din is a khwaeng (subdistrict) of Khlong Sam Wa District, in Bangkok, Thailand. In 2020, it had a total population of 13,117 people.

References

Subdistricts of Bangkok
Khlong Sam Wa district